Maisons du Monde is a French furniture and home decor company founded in Brest in 1996 by Xavier Marie. At the end of 2015 it had nearly 250 stores across France, Italy, Spain, Luxembourg, Belgium, Germany and in Switzerland, of which more than 180 are in France. In 2010, it generated nearly €323 million in sales. In 2015 it employed over 5,500 people.

History 
In 2006, Maisons du Monde launched its online shop and offered the whole of its catalogue of furniture and a large part of its objects of decoration. Maisons du Monde published a catalogue presenting its new collection at the beginning of the year.

The Maisons du Monde group was bought in 2013 (80%) by the American company Bain Capital for €680 million.

In 2015, it achieved a turnover of 699 million euros, of which 460 million in France.

February 2016 two US banks Goldman Sachs and Citigroup were mandated to prepare for an IPO.

In 2018, Maisons du Monde opened its first store in the United States, located in Wynwood, Florida. In 2019, Maisons du Monde opened a new store located in Aventura Mall, the third largest shopping mall in the United States

Number of stores 
265 stores in Europe:

 France: 193 stores
 Italy: 30 stores
 Luxembourg and Belgium: 16 stores
 Spain: 12 stores
 Germany: 8 stores
 United Kingdom: 4 stores (in Birmingham, London, Manchester and Leicester )
 Switzerland: 3 stores
 United States: 2 Stores

The brand sells online to United States, Germany, the United Kingdom, Portugal, the Netherlands and Austria.

References

External links 

 Maisons du Monde
 Maisons du Monde US

Furniture retailers
French companies established in 1996
Retail companies established in 1996
Retail companies of France
French brands
Companies listed on Euronext Paris